This is a list of fictional non-human primates in television, and is a subsidiary to the list of fictional primates.

See also
List of fictional primates

References

Television